"Lo Siento Mucho" (English: "I'm Very Sorry") is a song by Mexican duo Río Roma and singer Thalía. It was released by Sony Music Latin on February 28, 2020.

The song was a hit in Mexico where it was certified gold.

Background and release
The song was released on February 28, 2020. The song was written by José Luis Roma who also composed several songs for Thalía's album Amore Mío in 2014 and since then has kept a close friendship with her.

Music video
The music video for the song was released on the same day. The video features Río Roma and Thalía singing the song while a couple is going through rough times as their relationship ends.

Charts

Weekly charts

Year-end charts

Certifications

References 

Thalía songs
2020 singles
Sony Music Latin singles
Spanish-language songs